Love magic was an ancient belief that magic can conjure sexual passion or romantic love. Love magic motifs are often used in literature, such as fantasy or mythology. It is believed that it can be implemented in a variety of ways, such as by written spells, dolls, charms, amulets, potions, or rituals. It is attested to on cuneiform tablets from the ancient Near East, in ancient Egyptian texts, in the Greco-Roman world, the Middle Ages, and up to the present day.

Ancient love magic in Cuneiform 
Early examples love magic derive from the ancient Near East, dating to ca. 2200 BCE. Cuneiform tablets preserving rituals of erotic magic have been uncovered at Tell Inghara and Isin (present-day Iraq). Similar rituals are attested in ancient Egypt, for instance on an ostracon dated to the twentieth dynasty (twelfth-eleventh centuries BCE).

Hellenistic love magic 
Spells of erotic attraction and compulsion are found within the syncretic magic tradition of Hellenistic Greece, which incorporated Egyptian and Hebraic elements, as documented in texts such as the Greek Magical Papyri and archaeologically on amulets and other artifacts dating from the 2nd century BC (and sometimes earlier) to the late 3rd century A.D. These magical practices continued to influence private rituals in Gaul among Celtic peoples, in Roman Britain, and among Germanic peoples. Erotic magic reflected gender roles in ancient Greece and dismissed modern conceptions about gender roles and sexuality. Christopher Faraone, a University of Chicago Classics professor specializing in texts and practices pertaining to magic, distinguishes between the magic of eros, as practiced by men, and the magic of philia, practiced by women.

The two types of spells can be connected directly to the gender roles of men and women in Ancient Greece. Women used philia spells because they were more dependent on their husbands. In marriage, women were powerless, as men were legally permitted to divorce. As a result, many used any means necessary to maintain their marriages. Several women resorted to philia spells as they believed it retained their beauty and kept peace of mind.

Philia magic was used by women to keep their male companion at bay and faithful. Basic beliefs about sexual attitudes in Greece were dismissed by the findings in the philia love spells, potions, and rituals. The spells were not used by women to achieve sexual pleasure, but rather as a form of therapy or medicine. Women commonly used the philia spells in attempt to preserve their beauty and youth, which in effect would keep their beau faithful. Parallels can be drawn between philia spells and common medical practices by women today. Cosmetic surgery could be seen as serving the same purpose as the philia spell in terms of beautification.

Eros spells were mainly practiced by men and prostitutes served a completely different function in Ancient Greece. Eros spells were used to imbue lust and passion into women, compelling them to fulfill the man who invoked the spell's sexual desires. With limited freedom, women in Hellenistic Greece pursued emotional escape, aiming at more affection producing spells. Prostitutes were the notable minority of women who used eros spells. Prostitutes in Hellenistic Greece lived lives that were far more similar to men than women. They were financially free, could live where they chose, and were not expected to serve a single man and home. These were the only noted women to use Eros magic for sexual fulfilment.

Love magic in the Renaissance 

During the later medieval period (14th to 17th century), marriage developed into a central institution for public life. This was reflected in the adaptation of love magic: while the immediate desire was the act of intercourse itself, it was most often practiced in an attempt for a permanent union such as marriage. Magic was expensive and was believed to cause severe damage to the caster; therefore it was not taken lightly.  Thus, spells were not just cast upon just anyone in the Renaissance, but on those unions that held special importance. Men and women of status and favor were more often the targets of love magic. Economic or social class restrictions would often inhibit a marriage, and love magic was seen as a way to break those barriers, leading to social advancement.

While the spells were supposed to be kept secret, very rarely were they successful in this. However, if the victim realized that a spell was being cast upon them, believing in magic themselves, they would often submit to the believed enchantment, adding effectiveness to love magic.  This communication of one's desire is essential within the concept of love magic as it enabled a timid person to approach the unapproachable.

With the dominance of Christianity and Catholicism in Europe during the Renaissance, elements of Christianity seeped its way into the magic rituals themselves. Often, clay dolls or written spell scrolls would be hidden in the altar at churches, or holy candles would be lit in the rituals. The Host from a Catholic Mass would sometimes be taken and used in rituals to gain the desired result. Thus, love magic within the Renaissance period was both Christian and pagan.

Love magic in literature and art 
In literature and art, the motif of a genuine love spell is interwoven more often, and is sometimes made the starting point of tragic setbacks and complications. One of the earliest manifestations of the theme in the Western world is the story of Heracles and Deianeira. A famous treatment of the subject is in Richard Wagner's 1865 opera Tristan and Isolde, which in turn goes back to the same epic by Gottfried von Strassburg. Other examples of the use of love magic motif are Donizetti's 1832 opera The Elixir of Love (L'Elisir d'amore) and Manuel de Falla's 1915 ballet El amor brujo (The magic of love).

Women in love magic 
Love magic was seen as drawing "…heavily upon what was perceived as quintessentially feminine: fertility, birth, menstruation (seen as closely related to both fertility and birth), and a woman’s ‘nature’ or ‘shameful parts,’ that is, genitals".  This feminine attribute is reflected within the literature such as the Malleus Maleficarum, and in the trials of the Holy Office in which most of the cases brought before the council were women accused of bewitching men. This illustrates the common stereotype that men did not do magic.  According to historians Guido Ruggiero and Christopher A. Faraone, love magic often was associated with prostitutes and courtesans.  Women in these professions often held psychological power over their partners, with resentment sometimes resulting in drastic measures such as witchcraft accusations.

In the Early Middle Ages there is some evidence that women were considered more likely to be practitioners of love magic, which was considered to be a lesser intellectual type of magic. For instance, in the works of Regino of Prüm, Burchard of Worms and Hincmar the practitioners of love magic are usually gendered as female.

The view of women within the Renaissance can best be illustrated by the 1487 Malleus Maleficarum.  In the opening section of this text, it discusses the sexuality of women in relation to the devil. Heinrich Kramer wrote within his book that, "All witchcraft comes from carnal lust, which in women is insatiable."  The Men of the Renaissance feared the sexual power of the opposing gender.  They associated it with the devil, making witches out to be sexual partners with demons.  Kramer makes the case that a witch received her powers by inviting the devil to enter into carnal relations. Through her sexuality she gains her power, and thus her sexuality is seen as evil and something to be feared. In many of the witchcraft accusations brought before the Holy Office in the Roman Inquisition, men accused women of binding their passions and sexuality by the use of their own sexuality.

While within literature females dominate the witch world, some scholars believe that reality was much different.  Matthew W. Dickie, a prominent magic scholar, argues that men were the main casters of love magic.  Demographically, they suggest that the largest age group that practiced love magic were younger men targeting young, unobtainable women.  There are a variety of explanations for why the literary world contrasted reality in this area, but a common interpretation is that men were trying to subtract themselves from association.

See also 
 Sex magic

Notes

References 
Matthew W. Dickie.  "Who Practiced Love-Magic in Classical Antiquity and in the Late Roman World?" The Classical Quarterly, New Series, Vol. 50, No. 2 (2000), pp. 563–583. Published by: Cambridge University Press
Olga Lucia Valbuena.  "Sorceresses, Love Magic, and the Inquisition of Linguistic Sorcery in Celestina." PMLA, Vol. 109, No. 2 (Mar., 1994), pp. 207–224. Published by: Modern Language Association
 Paul C. Rosenblatt.  "Communication in the Practice of Love Magic." Social Forces, Vol. 49, No. 3 (Mar., 1971), pp. 482–487   Published by: University of North Carolina Press
 Robert W. Shirley and A. Kimball Romney.  "Love Magic and Socialization Anxiety: A Cross-Cultural Study." American Anthropologist, New Series, Vol. 64, No. 5, Part 1 (Oct., 1962), pp. 1028–1031.  Blackwell Publishing
Saar, Ortal-Paz. "Some Observations on Jewish Love Magic: The Importance of Cultural Specificity", Societas Magica 24 (2010), pp. 1–4.
Saar, Ortal-Paz. Jewish Love Magic: From Late Antiquity to the Middle Ages. Leiden and Boston: Brill, 2017.
Ruggiero, Guido. Binding Passions. Oxford Oxfordshire: Oxford University Press, 1993
Sack, Robert David.  "Magic and Space" Annals of the Association of American Geographers, Vol. 66, No. 2 (Jun., 1976), pp. 309–322 Published by: Taylor & Francis, Ltd. on behalf of the Association of American Geographers
Barbara Holdrige, 1430-1505 Malleus Maleficarum [sound recording] / by Heinrich Kramer and James Sprenger ; translated by Montague Summers. Abridged by Barbara Holdridge Publisher Caedmon, 1974

Love
Magic (supernatural)
Seduction
Witchcraft